The Experimental Television Center (ETC) (1969–2011) was a nonprofit electronic and media art center located in upstate New York.

History

The Experimental Television Center (ETC) was founded in 1971 by Ralph Hocking. The center was the result of the expansion of a media access program that Ralph Hocking established as professor of video and computer art at Binghamton University in 1969. Some years later, in July 1979, the center was moved from Binghamton to Owego, New York.

The ETC, directed by Ralph Hocking and Sherry Miller Hocking, was devoted to the exploration and development of potential uses of new technology in video and media art. Artists, social, cultural and educational organizations and also interested individuals worked in innovative image processing tools, using all the equipment and the studio facilities with no charge. The Center for more than 40 years had provided a residency program  that emphasized the aesthetic experimentation of electronic and media art though new technologies. Artists from around the world and students were trained and worked with rare and unique analog and digital devices for creating video artworks and had access to the media art library of the center. For Ralph Hocking, the center was "a learning place [...], where artists and engineers worked in tandem". In addition, the center organized exhibitions, workshops, cultural events, conferences and provided grand programs to support artists and non-profit media art programs.

In 2011, the Residency and Grants Program of the center was closed. The center’s media arts collection has since been archived and housed at the Rose Goldsen Archive of New Media Art through Cornell University Library’s Division of Rare and Manuscript Collections. The center, through the Video History Project, an ongoing research initiative, offers to the public a wealth of often unpublished documents  related to the early historical development of video art and community television, with a particular focus on upstate New York during the period 1968–1980. Since the closing of ETC’s art residency program in 2011, Signal Culture -a new nonprofit media arts organization located in the same small village of Owego- aims to support the creation of experimental media.

Artists
Some of the artists that have been active in the Experimental Television Center are the following:

Tools
One of the early projects at the center (1972), a research program aiming to develop a more flexible set of imaging tools for artists, involved the construction of the "Paik/Abe video synthesizer". This video synthesizer was designed by Shuya Abe and Nam June Paik and built at the center by David Jones and Robert Diamond, for the TV Lab at WNET-TV. The project was funded by the New York State Council on the Arts.

In the early 1970s, the center was the home to many innovative tools that artists in residency took advantage of to make complex and technologically progressive artworks. The "Abe colorizer" for example, "an image processing device, was the precursor of many of special effects that nowadays are taken for granted", as Bill T. Jones pointed out. In addition, the "Rutt/Etra scan processor" was part of the ETC studio and invented by Steve Rutt and Bill Etra in the early 1970s. Gary Hill, artist-in-residence at the Experimental Television Center from 1975 to 1977, explained that this scan processor "allowed one to manipulate the video image, providing an enormous amount of flexibility in altering a video input or in generating new images by using other inputs like waveforms".

In 1973, the center started a long-term collaboration with the artist and engineer Dave Jones, who was repairing, modifying and building video equipment for the center. After becoming the ETC’s full-time technician, Jones designed a series of tools for video image processing to be used at the Center by a number of video artists. Some of the tools available in the ETC studio included the "Jones colorizer" (1974, 1975), the "Jones 8-input sequencer" (1984, 1985), the "Jones keyer" (1985), the "Jones buffer" (1986), the "Voltage control", and the "Raster manipulation unit–wobbulator".

In mid- 1970s, the center started to research the interface of an "LSI-11 computer" with a video processing system with the collaboration of Steina and Woody Vasulka and the support of National Endowment for the Arts (NEA). Its purpose was to make a digital imaging system more user-friendly to the artists. In the late of 1970s and the beginning of 1980s, the ETC’s research programs shifted from the hardware building to artist-oriented software development and to completing new and old tools and systems.

From the beginning of the 1980s, the center’s interest transitioned to the new "Amiga computer". Subsequently, in the 1990s, the available image processing system was enriched by commercially available tools. According to Ralph and Sherry Miller Hocking, the image processing system became through the years “a hybrid tool set, permitting the artist to create interactive relationships between older historically analog instruments and new digital technologies”. In addition, at the beginning of the 1990s, using a computerized relational database, the center started to catalog the antique equipment, all the video and audio tapes and also the printed material.

References

Further reading

External links
 Official Experimental Television Center website
 ETC: Video History Project: Further Bibliography, Tools, Collection
 The repository of the Experimental Television Center Archives: Rose Goldsen Archive of New Media Art, Cornell University Library.
 The Vasulka Archives
 Official Signal Culture website
 Experimental Television Center video at the Vimeo

Art museums and galleries in New York (state)
Contemporary art galleries in the United States
Defunct art museums and galleries in New York (state)
American public access television
Experimental film
Video art
Computer art
Digital art
Internet art
New media art
Non-profit organizations based in New York (state)
Binghamton University
Cornell University
Upstate New York
Art galleries established in 1969
Art galleries disestablished in 2011
1969 establishments in New York (state)
2001 disestablishments in New York (state)
Film archives in the United States